Myrmica laevinodis is a species of ant that closely resembles M. kotokui, and is at times difficult to distinguish, due to variation in morphology and color in M. kotokui. The unraised rugae on the posterodorsal portion of the mesonotum are usually characteristic, though some M. kotokui workers have this character. It is best in the field to examine the body coloration of a number of workers from each colony. Also, M. rubra has fewer strong rugae, and is smoother on the lower half of the mesonotal pleura than M. kotokui; its propodeal spines are shorter, and the rugae on the anterior basal portion of the 1st gastral tergite are relatively weak and fewer in number. Although Japanese specimens differ morphologically from European M. rubra material, and resemble M. kotokui in petiolar morphology, the name Myrmica rubra is applied to them for the present. This species nests in the soil of grassland on seashores and lowlands (Onoyama, 1989). Rare in Japan.

Myrmica laevinodis have been known to feed on honeydew produced by aphids, in return for protecting them from parasites.

References

https://web.archive.org/web/20060824004642/http://ant.edb.miyakyo-u.ac.jp/E/Taxo/F40104.html

Myrmica
Insects described in 1846